The Case for Peace: How The Arab–Israeli Conflict Can Be Resolved is a 2005 book by Alan Dershowitz and follow-up to his 2003 book The Case for Israel.

Summary
Dershowitz was originally planning to write The Case Against Israel's Enemies; however, after the death of Yasser Arafat the author chose to focus on more positive and optimistic themes, believing that the death of the PA chairman has opened new doors to peace. Dershowitz argues that all reasonable people know that a final peace settlement will involve two states, the division of Jerusalem and a renunciation of violence. Dershowitz believes that the Palestinian state may be composed of multiple disjoint areas, because in today's world of high-speed internet and cheap travel, states do not require contiguity to be viable. He asserts that Palestinians should not be offered more than what was on the table during the Camp David negotiations of 2000, as it would reward violence. He concentrates on the shared elements of the peace process that he says both mainstream Israelis and Palestinians agree on.

Reception
Publishers Weekly remarked that Dershowitz "bombards opponents with inflammatory charges based on sometimes tendentious readings of skimpily contextualized remarks..." It also stated that the book lacked "the judicious treatment these issues cry out for."

Michael D. Langan of The Boston Globe writes: "Dershowitz makes a compelling 'Case for Peace'...The author's advocacy skills are well-honed and incisive. In fact, one is reminded of the logical argumentation used by Thomas Aquinas in his Summa Theologica...: laying out basic questions for analysis, exploring arguments that appear reasonable, and concluding with an equivalent of Aquinas's famous 'I answer that ...,' which gives the 'correct' answer.

Mark Lewis, writing for The New York Times Book Review, writes that "The Case for Peace is faithful to the title: Dershowitz says Yasser Arafat's death makes peace possible, if the Palestinians accept a state based in Gaza and 'nearly all of the West Bank,' with a division of greater Jerusalem." Lewis further writes:

See also
Arab–Israeli conflict

Notes

External links

Book excerpts
Amazon Online Reader: The Case for Peace: How the Arab–Israeli Conflict Can be Resolved
A Case Study in Hate and Intimidation – Chapter 16 of The Case For Peace PDF Format

Book reviews
The Case For Peace: New York Times Book Review
The Case For Peace: Boston Globe Book Review
"Famed attorney lays out plan for peace" Stephen Mark Dobbs, The Jewish News Weekly, January 26, 2007
The Case For Peace: Yale Israel Journal Review

Israeli–Palestinian conflict books
2005 non-fiction books
Books about the Arab–Israeli conflict
Books about Israel
Alan Dershowitz